This article concerns the period 149 BC – 140 BC.

References